Larry Lauer (1927-1992) was a center in the National Football League.

Biography
Lauer was born Lawrence Gene Lauer on August 27, 1927 in Chicago, Illinois.

Career
Lauer was drafted in the eighth round of the 1951 NFL Draft by the New York Yanks and later played two seasons with the Green Bay Packers. He played at the collegiate level at the University of Alabama.

See also
List of Green Bay Packers players

References

1927 births
1992 deaths
Players of American football from Chicago
Green Bay Packers players
American football centers
Alabama Crimson Tide football players